Kashruth Council of Canada (better known as COR), is a kosher certification agency in Canada. It is best known for its kosher supervision service, with the COR symbol found on the labels of many commercial and consumer food products. The council serves 1,000 facilities that provide 70,000 products to Canadian consumers. As of September 2014, COR employs 70 full-time and part-time mashgichim who work in local food service and catering venues, plus approximately 30 mashgichim worldwide who supervise COR-certified manufacturing plants. COR supervises food at event venues such as the Rogers Centre, the Air Canada Centre and the Toronto Zoo. In total, COR certifies 53 restaurants in Toronto.  COR, in conjunction with Liaison Culinary College, has a college accredited training program for its mashgichim.

COR answers questions about Kashruth on phone, email, text and social media. In April 2016, the month before Passover, COR collectively answered 10,000 questions.

History
COR was founded in November 1952. Before that, it was hard to get legitimately kosher meat in Toronto because there was no regulation. The Canadian Jewish Congress was asked to set up a system to ensure legitimacy of the kosher status of meat in Toronto. In 1954, a Rabbinical Board called the "Vaad Hakashruth of the Canadian Jewish Congress of the Central Region" was established. It then consisted of 12 Rabbis, having grown to 26 members as of 2017. In June 1956, the name of the Vaad Hakashruth was changed to the Council of Orthodox Rabbis, the source of the abbreviation COR. In the early 1960s, COR successfully appealed to Prime Minister John G. Diefenbaker to have Shechita legally approved by the federal government and protected by Canadian law. For many years, Rabbi Gedalia Felder was the chairman of the Vaad Hakashruth, and in 2006, his son Rabbi Yacov Felder became the vice chairman, and eventually the chairman.

See also
Kosher certification agency

References

Kosher food certification organizations
Jewish organizations based in Canada
Religious consumer symbols
Companies based in North York